Alfred (Alfred Ernest Albert; 6 August 184430 July 1900) was Duke of Saxe-Coburg and Gotha from 1893 to 1900. He was the second son and fourth child of Queen Victoria and Prince Albert. He was known as the Duke of Edinburgh from 1866 until he succeeded his paternal uncle Ernest II as the reigning Duke of Saxe-Coburg and Gotha in the German Empire.

Early life
Prince Alfred was born on 6 August 1844 at Windsor Castle to the reigning British monarch, Queen Victoria, and her husband, Prince Albert, the second son of Ernest I, Duke of Saxe-Coburg and Gotha. Nicknamed Affie, he was second in the line of succession to the British throne behind his elder brother, the Prince of Wales.

Alfred was baptised by the Archbishop of Canterbury, William Howley, at the Private Chapel in Windsor Castle on 6 September 1844. His godparents were his mother's first cousin, Prince George of Cambridge (represented by his father, the Duke of Cambridge); his paternal aunt, the Duchess of Saxe-Coburg and Gotha (represented by his maternal grandmother, the Duchess of Kent); and Queen Victoria's half-brother, the Prince of Leiningen (represented by the Duke of Wellington, Conservative Leader in the Lords).

Alfred remained second in line to the British throne from his birth until 8 January 1864, when his older brother Edward and his wife Alexandra of Denmark had their first child, Prince Albert Victor. Alfred became third in line to the throne and, as Edward and Alexandra continued to have children, Alfred was further demoted in the order of succession.

Entering the Royal Navy

In 1856, when he reached age 12, it was decided that Prince Alfred, in accordance with his own wishes, should enter the Royal Navy. A separate establishment was assigned to him, with Lieutenant J.C. Cowell, RE, as governor.

In July 1860, while on this ship, he paid an official visit to the Cape Colony, and made a very favourable impression both on the colonials and on the native chiefs. He took part in a hunt at Hartebeeste-Hoek, resulting in the slaughter of large numbers of game animals. 

On the abdication of King Otto of Greece, in 1862, Prince Alfred was chosen to succeed him, but the British government blocked plans for him to ascend the Greek throne, largely because of the Queen's opposition to the idea. She and her late husband had made plans for him to succeed to the Duchy of Saxe-Coburg.

Prince Alfred remained in the navy, and was promoted to lieutenant on 24 February 1863, serving under Count Gleichen on the corvette . He was promoted to captain on 23 February 1866 and was appointed to the command of the frigate  in January 1867. Lord Charles Beresford described him as having "a great natural ability for handling a fleet" and noted that he "would have made a first-class fighting admiral."

Duke of Edinburgh

In the Queen's Birthday Honours on 24 May 1866, the Prince was created Duke of Edinburgh, Earl of Ulster, and Earl of Kent with an annuity of £15,000 granted by Parliament. He took his seat in the House of Lords on 8 June.

While still in command of the Galatea, the Duke of Edinburgh started from Plymouth on 24 January 1867 for his voyage around the world. On 7 June 1867, he left Gibraltar, reached the Cape of Good Hope on 24 July, on 5 August 1867 the island of Tristan da Cunha, and paid a royal visit to Cape Town on 24 August 1867 after landing at Simon's Town a while earlier. He landed at Glenelg, South Australia, on 31 October 1867. 

Being the first member of the royal family to visit Australia, he was received with great enthusiasm. During his stay of nearly five months he visited Adelaide, Melbourne, Sydney, Brisbane and Tasmania. Several institutions, including Prince Alfred College, The Alfred Hospital, and Royal Prince Alfred Hospital were named in his honour.

On 12 March 1868, on his second visit to Sydney, he was invited by Sir William Manning, President of the Sydney Sailors' Home, to picnic at the beachfront suburb of Clontarf to raise funds for the home. At the function, he was wounded in the back by a revolver fired by Henry James O'Farrell. Alfred was shot just to the right of his spine. He was tended to for the next two weeks by six nurses, trained by Florence Nightingale and led by Matron Lucy Osburn, who had just arrived in Australia in February 1868.

In the violent struggle during which Alfred was shot, William Vial had managed to wrest the gun away from O'Farrell until bystanders assisted. Vial, a master of a Masonic Lodge, had helped to organise the picnic in honour of the Duke's visit and was presented with a gold watch for securing Alfred's life. Another bystander, George Thorne, was wounded in the foot by O'Farrell's second shot. O'Farrell was arrested at the scene, quickly tried, convicted and hanged on 21 April 1868.

On the evening of 23 March 1868, the most influential people of Sydney voted for a memorial building to be erected, "to raise a permanent and substantial monument in testimony of the heartfelt gratitude of the community at the recovery of HRH". This led to a public subscription which paid for the construction of Royal Prince Alfred Hospital.

Alfred soon recovered from his injury and was able to resume command of his ship and return home in early April 1868. He reached Spithead on 26 June 1868, after an absence of seventeen months.

He visited Hawaii in 1869 and spent time with the royal family there, where he was presented with leis upon his arrival. He also became the first European prince to visit Japan and on 4 September 1869, he was received at an audience by the teenaged Emperor Meiji in Tokyo.

The Duke's next voyage was to India, where he arrived in December 1869, and Ceylon (now Sri Lanka), which he visited the following year. In both countries and at Hong Kong, which he visited on the way, he was the first British prince to set foot in the country. The native rulers of India vied with one another in the magnificence of their entertainments during the stay of three months. In Ceylon a reception was given for him, by the request of the British, by Charles Henry de Soysa, the richest man in Ceylon, at his private residence which was consequently renamed, by permission, Alfred House. Alfred reportedly ate off gold plates with gold cutlery inlaid with jewels.

Potential matches
In 1862, Queen Victoria wrote to Victoria, Princess Royal that she wanted Alfred to marry Princess Dagmar of Denmark. She wrote: "I hear that the Emperor of Russia has not given up his intention of asking for Alix or Dagmar for his son. I should be very sorry if any thing were decided for Dagmar before you had seen her, as it would be one chance less for Affie." However, she decided against the match because of Germany's anger towards Denmark over the disputed territories of Schleswig-Holstein, especially since Alfred was the heir to Coburg. She wrote to Victoria, Princess Royal "Respecting Dagmar, I do not wish her to be kept for Affie. Let the Emperor have her." Dagmar later married Alexander III and became the Empress of Russia.

Queen Victoria considered Grand Duchess Olga Constantinovna of Russia as a potential wife for Alfred. She wrote to Victoria, Princess Royal, "It is a great pity that Sanny's charming daughter is a Greek [Orthodox]– she would do so well". In 1867, Queen Victoria told Victoria, Princess Royal that "I had thought and hoped at one time for dear little Olga, who is now to marry King George".

Marriage
During a visit to his sister Princess Alice, in August 1868 he met Grand Duchess Maria Alexandrovna of Russia, then fourteen years old.  Princess Alice was married to Maria Alexandrovna's first cousin.  The Grand Duchess was visiting her maternal relatives, the Princes of Battenberg, at Jugenheim.

On 23 January 1874, the Duke of Edinburgh married the Grand Duchess Maria Alexandrovna of Russia, the second (and only surviving) daughter of Emperor Alexander II of Russia and his first wife Princess Marie of Hesse and by Rhine, daughter of Louis II, Grand Duke of Hesse and by Rhine and Princess Wilhelmine of Baden, at the Winter Palace, St Petersburg. To commemorate the occasion, a small English bakery made the now internationally popular Marie biscuit, with the Duchess' name imprinted on its top.

The Duke and Duchess of Edinburgh made their public entry into London on 12 March. The marriage, however, was not a happy one, and the bride was thought haughty by London Society. She was surprised to discover that she had to yield precedence to the Princess of Wales and all of Queen Victoria's daughters and demanded that she take precedence before the Princess of Wales (the future Queen Alexandra) because she considered the Princess of Wales's family (the Danish royal family) to be inferior to her own. Queen Victoria refused this demand, yet granted her precedence immediately after the Princess of Wales. Her father gave her the then-staggering sum of £100,000 as a dowry, plus an annual allowance of £32,000.

Flag rank
Alfred was stationed in Malta for several years and his third child, Victoria Melita, was born there in 1876. Promoted rear-admiral on 30 December 1878, he became admiral superintendent of naval reserves, with his flag in the corvette  in November 1879. Promoted to vice-admiral on 10 November 1882, he was given command of the Channel Squadron, with his flag in the armoured ship , in December 1883. He became Commander-in-Chief, Mediterranean Fleet, with his flag in the armoured ship , in March 1886, and having been promoted to admiral on 18 October 1887, he went on to be Commander-in-Chief, Plymouth in August 1890. He was promoted to Admiral of the Fleet on 3 June 1893.

Percy Scott wrote in his memoirs that "as a Commander-in-Chief, the Duke of Edinburgh had, in my humble opinion, no equal. He handled a fleet magnificently, and introduced many improvement in signals and manoeuvring." He "took a great interest in gunnery." "The prettiest ship I have ever seen was the [Duke of Edinburgh's flagship] HMS Alexandra. I was informed that £2,000 had been spent by the officers on her decoration."

Alfred was very fond of music and took a prominent part in establishing the Royal College of Music, created in 1882. He was a keen violinist, but had little skill. At a dinner party given by one of his brothers, he was persuaded to play. Sir Henry Ponsonby wrote: 'Fiddle out of tune and noise abominable.'

Duke of Saxe-Coburg and Gotha
 
On the death of his uncle, Ernest II, Duke of Saxe-Coburg and Gotha, on 22 August 1893, the duchy fell to the Duke of Edinburgh, since his elder brother (the Prince of Wales) had renounced his right to the succession before he married. Alfred thereupon surrendered his British allowance of £15,000 a year and his seats in the House of Lords and the Privy Council, but he retained the £10,000 granted on his marriage to maintain Clarence House as his London residence. At first regarded with some coldness in the Duchy as a "foreigner", he gradually gained popularity. By the time of his death in 1900, he had generally won the good opinion of his subjects.

Alfred and Maria's only son, Alfred, Hereditary Prince of Saxe-Coburg and Gotha, became involved in a scandal involving his mistress and apparently shot himself in January 1899, in the midst of his parents' twenty-fifth wedding anniversary celebrations at the Schloss Friedenstein in Gotha. He survived, but his embarrassed mother sent him off to Meran to recover, where he died two weeks later, on 6 February. His father was devastated.

Alfred died of throat cancer on 30 July 1900 in a lodge adjacent to Schloss Rosenau, the ducal summer residence just north of Coburg. As his younger brother, Prince Arthur, Duke of Connaught and Strathearn and nephew Prince Arthur, had renounced their succession rights to the ducal throne, Alfred was succeeded by his nephew, Prince Charles Edward, Duke of Albany (1884–1954), the posthumous son of his youngest brother, Prince Leopold, Duke of Albany.

He was survived by his mother, Victoria, who had already outlived two of her children, Alice and Leopold. She died six months later.

Alfred was a keen collector of glass and ceramic ware, and after his death his widow gave his collection, valued at half a million marks, to the Veste Coburg, the enormous fortress on a hill top above Coburg.

Legacy

Australia
Royal Prince Alfred Hospital in Sydney, The Alfred Hospital in Melbourne, Prince Alfred College in Adelaide, Prince Alfred Park in Sydney, Prince Alfred Square in Parramatta, and the Royal Prince Alfred Yacht Club, now in the Sydney suburb of Newport, are named in his honour.

The Alfred Hall in Ballarat was built in 1867 for his visit, and one of the city's suburbs was renamed Alfredton. Many streets, avenues, roads, halls, parks and schools bear his name in other parts of Australia. He laid the corner stones of new town halls in the two biggest cities, Sydney and Melbourne, and those buildings continue in use today.

Barbados
Prince Alfred Street in Bridgetown, the capital of Barbados, was named in his honour. It begins at the junction with Chapel Street and proceeds southward until reaching a car park along the Constitution river in the vicinity of the former James Fort.

Canada
Prince Alfred Bay, Nunavut, was named in his honour, as was Cape Prince Alfred in the North West Territories. Two islands in Ontario are named for Prince Alfred, one in the St Lawrence River near Brockville, and the other in Lake Nipigon north of Thunder Bay. The Prince Alfred Arch, a monument in Tangier, Nova Scotia, marks the spot Prince Alfred visited in 1861.

New Zealand 
The name of the small township of Alfredton (near Eketahuna in the lower North Island of New Zealand) honours the prince. Alfred Street in central Auckland was named in his honour. The Bay of Plenty settlement of Galatea is named after his ship. Mt Alfred in Wellington - adjacent to Mt Victoria named after his mother and Mt Albert after his father - is named after him.

South Africa
Prince Alfred sailed into Port Elizabeth on 6 August 1860 as a midshipman on HMS Euryalus and celebrated his 16th birthday among its citizens. Seven years later he sailed into Simon's Town as the Captain of HMS Galatea. In Port Elizabeth there is a Prince Alfred's Terrace. The Alfred Rowing Club was established in 1864 and was housed under the pier at Table Bay. It was named after Prince Alfred, Duke of Edinburgh, who visited the Cape in 1860. It is the oldest organised sporting club in South Africa. The opening ceremony of the South African Library was performed by Prince Alfred in 1860. An impressive portrait of the Prince hangs in the main reading room.

Port Alfred, on the Kowie River in the Eastern Cape, was originally known as Port Frances after the daughter-in-law of the Governor of Cape Colony, Lord Charles Somerset. Of all the passes built in South Africa by the famous Andrew Geddes Bain and his son, Thomas, Prince Alfred's Pass remains, for many people, a favourite because of its lavish variety winding through some of the world's most unspoiled scenery.

In Simon's Town, the Prince Alfred Hotel was built in 1802 and renamed after the prince visited Cape Province in 1868. For more than two centuries Simon's Town has been an important naval base and harbour (first for the Royal Navy and now the South African Navy). The former hotel now houses the Backpackers' Hostel, opposite the harbour in the main street. In Cape Town during his visit in 1868, Prince Alfred ceremonially tipped the first load of rock to commence the building of the Breakwater. This was built by convict labour and formed the protective seawall for the new Cape Town Harbour, now redeveloped as the Victoria & Alfred Waterfront and a popular tourist and shopping destination.

A Prince Alfred Street can be found in Pietermaritzburg, Queenstown, Grahamstown and Caledon. The Port Elizabeth Chapter of the Memorable Order of Tin Hats, a veterans association, is known as the Prince Alfred Shellhole. Prince Alfred Hamlet, a small town in the Western Cape province, is named after Alfred.

United Kingdom
One of the stamp collectors in the British royal family, Prince Alfred won election as honorary president of The Philatelic Society, London in 1890. He may have inspired his nephew George V, who benefited after the Prince of Wales (later Edward VII) bought his brother Prince Alfred's collection. The merging of Alfred's and George's collections gave birth to the Royal Philatelic Collection.

Edinburgh of the Seven Seas, the settlement on Tristan da Cunha, a British Overseas territory, was named after Alfred after he visited the remote islands in 1867 while Duke of Edinburgh.

Manta alfredi is commonly known as Prince Alfred's manta ray.

Honours and arms

Honours
British honours
KG: Royal Knight of the Garter, 10 June 1863
KT: Extra Knight of the Thistle, 15 October 1864
KP: Knight of St. Patrick, 14 May 1880
GCB: Knight Grand Cross of the Bath (military), 25 May 1889
GCSI: Knight Grand Commander of the Star of India, 7 February 1870
GCMG: Knight Grand Cross of St Michael and St George, 29 June 1869
GCIE: Knight Grand Commander of the Indian Empire, 21 June 1887
GCVO: Knight Grand Cross of the Royal Victorian Order, 24 May 1899
PC: Privy Counsellor, 18661893
KStJ: Knight of Justice of St. John, 27 March 1896
ADC: Personal aide-de-camp to Queen Victoria, 9 December 1882

Foreign honours

Arms
Prince Alfred gained use of the royal arms of the United Kingdom, charged with an inescutcheon of the shield of the Duchy of Saxony, representing his paternal arms, the whole differenced by a label argent of three points, the outer points bearing anchors azure, and the inner a cross gules. When he became the Duke of Saxe-Coburg and Gotha, his Saxon arms were his British arms inverted, as follows: the ducal arms of Saxony charged with an inescutcheon of the royal arms of the United Kingdom differenced with a label argent of three points, the outer points bearing anchors azure, and the inner a cross gules.

Issue

Archives
Alfred's letters to his third daughter, Alexandra, (as well as her sisters) are preserved in the Hohenlohe Central Archive (Hohenlohe-Zentralarchiv Neuenstein) in Neuenstein Castle in the town of Neuenstein, Baden-Württemberg, Germany.

Ancestry

Footnotes

References
 
 McKinlay, Brian The First Royal Tour, 1867–1868, (London: Robert Hale & Company, c1970, 1971) 200p. 
 Sandner, H., Das Haus Sachsen-Coburg und Gotha, (Coburg: Neue Presse, 2001).
 Van der Kiste, John, & Jordaan, Bee Dearest Affie, (Gloucester: Alan Sutton, 1984)
 Van der Kiste, John Alfred, (Stroud: Fonthill Media, 2013)

External links

  [CC-By-SA]

|-

|-

1844 births
1900 deaths
19th-century British people
People from Windsor, Berkshire
Dukes of Saxe-Coburg and Gotha
Dukes of Edinburgh
 Alfred
Protestant monarchs
Princes of the United Kingdom
House of Saxe-Coburg and Gotha (United Kingdom)
Royal Navy admirals of the fleet
People associated with the Royal College of Music
People associated with the Royal National College for the Blind
Members of the Privy Council of the United Kingdom
Knights Grand Cross of the Order of St Michael and St George
Knights of St Patrick
Knights of the Garter
Knights of the Golden Fleece of Spain
Knights of the Thistle
Knights Grand Cross of the Royal Victorian Order
Knights Grand Commander of the Order of the Indian Empire
Knights Grand Commander of the Order of the Star of India
Knights Grand Cross of the Order of the Bath
Grand Crosses of the Order of Saint Stephen of Hungary
Knights of Justice of the Order of St John
Grand Croix of the Légion d'honneur
3
3
3
Recipients of the Order of the Cross of Takovo
Knights Grand Cross of the Order of Saints Maurice and Lazarus
Deaths from esophageal cancer
Deaths from cancer in Germany
Burials at the Ducal Family Mausoleum, Glockenburg Cemetery, Coburg
British philatelists
British shooting survivors
Fathers of philately
Earls of Ulster
British princes
Children of Queen Victoria
Edinburgh Militia officers